Robert William McAneeley (born November 7, 1950) is a former World Hockey Association player. He played 174 games for the Edmonton Oilers. He is the twin brother of NHL and WHA player Ted McAneeley and the two were teammates with the Oilers in 1975-76.

External links
 

1950 births
Living people
Canadian ice hockey left wingers
Edmonton Oilers (WHA) players
Ice hockey people from British Columbia
Sportspeople from Cranbrook, British Columbia
Winston-Salem Polar Twins (SHL) players